Narwietooma Station, most commonly known as Narwietooma, is a pastoral lease that operates as a cattle station in the Northern Territory of Australia.

Narwietooma is surrounded by other leases including Glen Helen Station to the south west, Derwent Station to the west, Napperby Station to the north and Amburla to the east, and the West MacDonnell National Park to the south.

It is fenced into 80 separate paddocks and is watered by 60 bores and 35 dams.

The lease was first established in 1942 by a partnership between Edward Connellan, who owned another station named Narwie, and F. O'Keefe, who owned a property named Tooma; the name of the lease was a portmanteau of the names of the other two properties.

Connellan was an experienced pilot, and later established Connellan Airways in 1943. He picked out the land for the station in 1938 when doing aerial surveys to assess the viability of an air service.

Following the death of his partners, Connellan acquired complete ownership of Narwietooma in 1946. He sank the first bore in 1947 and began grazing cattle in 1948. His family moved to the property in 1955 and Connellan supervised all station work.

 the  property was still on the market along with at least 15 others in the Northern Territory.

See also
List of ranches and stations

References

Stations (Australian agriculture)
Pastoral leases in the Northern Territory
1942 establishments in Australia